Sina Najafi is the founder and editor-in-chief of New York-based Cabinet magazine. Najafi has also curated a number of art-related exhibitions, including "Philosophical Toys," "Odd Lots: Revisiting Gordon Matta-Clark's Fake Estates," and "The Paper Sculpture Show."

Education
Najafi obtained his degree in Comparative Literature from Princeton University, Columbia University, and New York University.

Career
Najafi is the editor-in-chief at Cabinet Magazine and co-director of Immaterial Incorporated. He has taught courses at Cooper Union, Yale, and RISD.

References

External links
Artkrush.com - interview with Sina Najafi
apexart - "Philosophical Toys" show

American magazine editors
Living people
American people of Iranian descent
Princeton University alumni
Year of birth missing (living people)
Place of birth missing (living people)